Mabinay, officially the Municipality of Mabinay,  is a 1st class municipality in the province of Negros Oriental, Philippines. According to the 2020 census, it has a population of 82,953 people , making it the most-populous municipality in Negros Oriental.

History

Folklore has it that a woman named Binay fell in love with the son of her father's rival chieftain. Her father ended the affair by having her lover killed. Binay grieved. Mother Nature took the weeping maiden into her bosom. Where Binay was laid to rest, a spring broke forth. According to the legend, she weeps to this day, feeding Mabinay Spring, one of the town's many alluring attractions.

It had over 100 known caves, including the popular Pandalihan, Panligawan and Gasidlak, each one with its own distinctive features ranging from fascinating to awesome. A team of Belgian and Dutch cavers determined Odloman Cave to be the second longest in the Philippines.

Mabinay was carved from barrios of Bais and created a municipality in 1960. In 1966 more barrios of Bais and Manjuyod were annexed to enlarge it. Mabinay produces rice and corn, copra, soybeans and peanuts. Its principal crop, sugar cane, makes it an important member of the north's sugar district. It is a border town: the Provincial Highway runs through it and links Negros Oriental with its sister province.

Travel from Dumaguete is about two hours.

Geography
Mabinay is situated roughly in the central part of the island of Negros abutting the western side of the provincial boundary. The municipality of Ayungon bounds it in the north, the City of Bais in the south, the municipalities of Bindoy and Manjuyod and a portion of Bais in the east, and the province of Negros Occidental in the west.

Barangays
Mabinay is politically subdivided into 32 barangays.

Climate

Demographics

Economy

Tourism
Mabinay is known for its caves.

Aside from the caves, Mabinay also has rivers and natural springs. One of its known natural spring is located at the heart of the municipality, the Mabinay spring. Ideal for family outing, swimming, kayaking, it also serves as the main water resource of the main town. It is about a 3 to 5 minute ride with tricycle, jeepney or a bus from the town center.

Healthcare
Mabinay itself has a small government-run hospital.
Mabinay Medicare Community Hospital provides both in emergency outpatients services and inpatient services. It is located directly behind the Municipal Hall.
Mabinay Health Center, one of three Mabinay health centers.

Transportation
Motorcycles or "habal-habal", tricycles, jeepneys, and buses are the major modes of transportation in the municipality.

Education
The Mabinay National High School (formerly Mabinay Municipal High School) is a high standard accredited institution according to the Philippine Department of Education.

Mabinay Science High School is a Secondary Public Science High School system that is a DepEd-recognized institution.

The Santo Niño High School is a private Catholic institution located at Barangay Lumbangan.

On June 16, 1997, the Sangguniang Bayan (Municipal Council) Resolution No. 94 established the Mabinay Institute of Technology (MIT), a technical college operated with the approval of the Department of Education, Culture and Sports. On June 25, 2004, the Mabinay Institute of Technology (MIT) was integrated into the newly converted university, Negros Oriental State University by virtue of the university charter, Republic Act No. 9299 signed by President Gloria Macapagal Arroyo on June 25, 2004,  and to be known as Mabinay Campus (NORSU-M).

References

External links

 [ Philippine Standard Geographic Code]
Philippine Census Information
Local Governance Performance Management System

Municipalities of Negros Oriental